Achola Rosario (born 28 October 1978) is a Ugandan artist and reporter. Rosario uses art, poetry, and unconventional lifestyle to drive her activism on topics such as politics, love, sex, and a balance of power between the haves and the have not's, the female and the male, the strong and the weak. Achola writes for Independent Uganda. She is also an award-winning entrepreneur.

Background and education 
Now a film-maker and producer of The FOMO (Fear of Missing Out) Travel Show, Achola Rosario has come through her career in an unconventional manner. According to a profile of Rosario from South Planet, she comes from a family of "traditional herbalist[s], doctors and dream interpreters," which has influenced the content and symbolism of her work. She was one of the first students at the Ecole Françoise de Kampala.

Rosario completed her Ordinary and Advanced levels at Bedgebury Upper School for girls  in England. While at the school, her favourite subjects were Art, Photography, literature and Chemistry practicals.   She won a school art prize before her graduation. later joined American College in London and transferred to Luton University where she studied International Business Systems.

Rosario's was inspired to be an activist after reading the works of Alice Walker. Her journalism is inspired by social norms she observed as a student in both England and Uganda.

Exhibitions 
She trained in photography. She has been organizing exhibitions since 1999. Below is her selected exhibitions.

 2013: Afriart Gallery, Kampala
 2003: Nommo Gallery, Kampala
 2003: Design Agenda Gallery, Kampala
 2000: Okapi Gallery, Kampala

See also 
 Paa Joe
 List of newspapers in Uganda
 Media in Uganda
 Andrew Mwenda
 The independent Uganda

References

External links 
 Forward Ever Backward Never, Global Imaginations
 Achola Rosario on Pinterest
 Website of Independent Magazine Uganda
 Website of Radio One Uganda

Living people
1978 births
Ugandan women journalists
Academic staff of Kampala University
Ugandan journalists